Shi Yan (born 30 May 2002) is a Chinese footballer currently playing as a forward or midfielder for Tianjin Jinmen Tiger.

Club career
Shi Yan would play for the Shandong Taishan youth team before being promoted to the senior team and was loaned out to third tier football club Inner Mongolia Caoshangfei to gain senior experience. On his return he would be loaned out once again, this time to top tier club Tianjin Jinmen Tiger where he made his debut for them in a league game on 22 July 2022 against Shanghai Shenhua in a 3-1 defeat. This would be followed by his first goal for the club on 28 July 2021 in a league game against Changchun Yatai in a 4-1 defeat. On 28 April 2022 he would officially join Tianjin on a permanent basis for the start of the next season.

Career statistics
.

References

External links

2002 births
Living people
Chinese footballers
Association football forwards
Chinese Super League players
Shandong Taishan F.C. players
Tianjin Jinmen Tiger F.C. players